This article lists notable Indian Christians. The list includes both Indians who lived within India and its predecessor states, and those of Indian ancestry who resided in other countries.

Freedom fighters 

Accamma Cherian She was popularly known as the Jhansi Rani of Travancore
 K. C. Mammen Mappillai
Titusji 
 Kali Charan Banerjee (1847–1902)
Krishna Mohan Banerjee
Amrit Kaur
Harendra Coomar Mookerjee
Pandita Ramabai
S. K. Rudra

Business 

M. G. George Muthoot, Chairman of Muthoot Group
Verghese Kurien, father of White Revolution and Operation Flood in India
Joy Alukkas, Indian Entrepreneur
Sunny Varkey, Entrepreneur and Founder of GEMS Education
Jose Alukkas
K.M Mamman Mappilai, Founder of MRF
Sabu M Jacob, Managing Director, Kitex Garments Limited
Tony Fernandes, Malasian Entrepreneur 
Santhosh George Kulangara, Founder of Safari TV
Noble Babu Thomas, Filim Producer 
Annamma Mathew, Founder of Vanitha
Mathai George Muthoot, Indian Businessman 
Victor Menezes, Indian Banker 
Mammen Mathew, Chief Editor, Malayala Manorama
Ivan Menezes,  CEO of Diageo
K. M. Mathew
Francisco D'Souza , Former CEO and Vice Chairman of Cognizant 
Gerson D'Cunha, advertising professional who was also a stage and film actor, social worker, and author

Politicians, activists and Indian Civil Service 
Ajit Jogi, first Chief Minister of Chhattisgarh
John Matthai, Minister of Railways in First Cabinet of Independent India.
George Fernandes was an Indian trade unionist, statesman, journalist, freethinker.
K. M. George (politician), Founder of Kerala Congress 
Madhusudan Das Indian lawyer and social reformer, he was the first graduate and advocate of Orissa (Present Odisha).
A.K Antony, 23rd Defence Minister of India and former Chief Minister of Kerala
 23rd Defence Minister of India and fo
  Former Chief Minisf Kerala and 
Oommen Chandy, former Chief Ministers of Kerala
A. J. John, founder leader of Travancore State Congress

 K M Mani, politician in the Kerala Congress (M)
 Baby John , Politician in Kerala 
M. M. Thomas, Christian theologian and social activist who served as Governor of Nagaland (1990–1992).
 Y. S. Rajasekhara Reddy (1949–2009), former Chief Minister of Andhra Pradesh
Y. S. Vivekananda Reddy, former M. P. of Kadapa and Minister of Andhra Pradesh
Thomas Chandy Former minister, Businessman.
Joachim Baxla,4 time MP of Alipurduar in West Bengal and Revolutionary Socialist Party politician
Margaret Alva
Fr. Stan Swamy Indian Roman Catholic priest and tribal rights activist

Indian Armed Forces and Indian Police Service 

 General Sunith Francis Rodrigues, PVSM, VSM , (19 September 1933 - 4 March 2022) was a retired Indian army officer who was Chief of the Army Staff of the Indian Army from 1990 to 1993 and Governor of Punjab from 2004 to 2010.
 Lieutenant-General Francis Tiburtius Dias,  PVSM , AVSM , Vrc (14 October 1934 – 16 January 2019) was a retired Indian Army officer, who was involved in the Indo-Pakistani War of 1971.
 Major General Ian Cardozo,  AVSM , SM, is a former Indian Army officer. During the Indo-Pakistani War of 1971, After the fall of Dhaka, Cardozo stepped on a land mine and his leg was critically injured. Due to non-availability of morphine or pethidine, and absence of medics, his leg could not be amputated surgically. He subsequently used his khukri to amputate his own leg He was the first war-disabled officer of the Indian Army to command a battalion and a brigade.
 Admiral Oscar Stanley Dawson,  PVSM , AVSM (13 November 1923 – 23 October 2011) was a four-star admiral in the Indian Navy. He served as the 11th Chief of the Naval Staff from 1 March 1982 to 30 November 1984 . He was the Director of Naval Operations during the Indo-Pakistan War of 1971 . After retirement, Admiral Dawson served as the Indian High Commissioner to New Zealand
 Major General Eustace D'Souza
 Julio Rebeiro, Padma Bhushan, Commissioner of Police Mumbai, Director General Central Reserve Police Force, Director General of Police Gujarat, Director General of Police Punjab, Indian Ambassador to Romania
 Ronald Mendonca, Commissioner of Police, Mumbai (21 August 1997 — 5 May 2000)

Cinema 
John Abraham, Indian Actor and Producer 
Katrina Kaif, Indian Actress 
Aju Varghese, Nasrani Mappila actor and producer
Ian D'Sa, Canadian Guitarist 
Basil Joseph, Nasrani Mappila director and actor
Esther Anil, Malayali actress
Tiger Prabhakar, Kannada cinema actor
 Vijay (actor)
 Vikram (actor)
 Genelia D'Souza, 
 Johnny Lever, Hindi comedian actor
 Kunchacko Boban
 Lal (actor), Malayali director and actor
Lalu Alex, Nasrani Mappila actor
 Nagma, movie actress and politician.
 Lal Jose, Indian Film Director 
 Nayanthara, Malayali actress
 Freida Pinto, Indian - American Actress 
Nivin Pauly, Nasrani Mappila actor
Rimi Tomy, Malayali actress and singer
Sathyan (actor), Malayali Actor, Police inspector, soldier (Viceroy's Commissioned Officer), clerk, school teacher
Andrea Jeremiah, Indian Actress and Playback Singer 
Tovino Thomas, Nasrani Mappila actor
Jean Paul Lal, Actor and Director
Navodaya Appachan, Indian Film Producer and Entrepreneur
Joju George, South Indian Actor
Siju Wilson, Indian Actor
Roshan Mathew, Film Actor
John Abraham, Indian Actor and Producer 
Rosshan Andrrews, Film Director
Alphonse Puthren, Indian Film Director and Writer 
Shine Tom Chacko, Indian Actor
Asin, Indian Actress
Chris Perry, Indian Musician and Film Producer
Sebastian D'Souza, Music Arranger
Amala Paul, South Indian Actress
Rimi Tomy, Indian Singer and Actress
Miya (actress)
Genelia D'Souza, Indian Actress
Meera Jasmine, Actress
Amy Jackson, Actress
Regina Cassandra, Indian Actress
Ileana D'Cruz, Indian - born Portuguese Actress
Catherine Tresa, Actress
Oviya, Tamil Actress
Shalini, South Indian Actress
Richard Rishi, Indian Actor 

Dino Morea, Actor

Sports 
Michael Ferreira, three-time Billiards Amateur World Champion
Vijay Hazare, Cricketer. He captained India in 14 matches between 1951 and 1953. In India's 25th Test match, nearly 20 years after India achieved Test status, he led India to its first ever Test cricket win (and the only victory under his captaincy) in 1951–52 against England at Madras,
Roger Binny, Indian cricketer, part of Indian squad that won the 1983 Cricket World Cup Final
Vinod Kambli, cricketer
Mahesh Bhupathi, professional tennis player also widely regarded as among the best doubles players in the world with 11 Grand Slam titles to his credit
Mary Kom, Olympic bronze medallist in 2012 Summer Olympics, London
Jimmy George is often considered one of the greatest volleyball players of all time and was a member of India men's national volleyball team. Jimmy George was just 21 years old when he received the Arjuna Award for his talent on the volleyball court.
Anju Bobby George, Indian Athelete
Leander Paes, Tennis Player
Vece Paes, field hockey player
Mary Kom, Indian Boxer. She is the only woman to win the World Amateur Boxing Championship six times, the only female boxer to have won a medal in each one of the first seven World Championships, and the only boxer (male or female) to win eight World Championship medals. Nicknamed Magnificent Mary, she was the only Indian female boxer to have qualified for the 2012 Summer Olympics, where she competed in the flyweight (51 kg) category and won a bronze medal. She had also been ranked as the world's No. 1 female light-flyweight by the International Boxing Association (amateur) (AIBA). She became the first Indian female boxer to win a gold medal in the Asian Games in 2014 at Incheon, South Korea and is the first Indian female boxer to win gold at the 2018 Commonwealth Games. She is also the only boxer to become Asian Amateur Boxing Champion for a record six times. Mary Kom won the 51 kg gold in President's Cup in Indonesia. She was also a former Member of Parliament, Rajya Sabha.
Dipika Pallikal She is the first Indian to break into the top 10 in the PSA Women's rankings.
Shiny Wilson, Indian athlete. She has been a National Champion in 800 metres for 14 years.
Robin Uthappa, Indian Cricketer. Robin has represented team India in ODIs and T20Is.He is nicknamed 'The Walking Assassin' for his tactic of charging down towards the bowler. He played an important role in India's win at the 2007 ICC World Twenty20. He finished the 2014–15 Ranji Trophy season as the highest run scorer that season and was also the highest run-scorer that year in the IPL. 
Sanju Samson, Indian Cricketer. A right-handed wicket-keeper-batter, he was the vice-captain of the Indian U-19 team for the 2014 Under-19 Cricket World Cup. He made his India debut in the 2015 away T20I against Zimbabwe. He made his ODI debut in 2021 against Sri Lanka.
K. M. Beenamol, an international athlete from India.she became the third Indian woman to reach an Olympic semi-final since P. T. Usha and Shiny Wilson.
Tintu Luka, she is the national record holder in the women's 800 metres. Luka represented India at the 2012 and 2016 Summer Olympics. In addition to being the 2015 Asian Champion in the 800 meters, she has won a total of six medals at the Asian Athletics Championships.
Geethu Anna Jose, Indian Basketball Player, who has been the captain of the Indian women's national basketball team.
T. C. Yohannan, Indian long jumper who held the national record in long jump for nearly 3 decades and represented India in the 1976 Summer Olympics in Montreal, Quebec, Canada. Yohannan will be known for the new dimension he gave to long jump in India in 1974, the occasion was the Tehran Asian Games of 1974. Yohannan cleared a distance of 8.07 metres at the Teheran Asian Games for a new Asian record.
K.M Binu, Indian Athelete
Joseph Abraham, Indian hurdler. He holds the current 400 metre hurdles State record of 49.51 seconds set during the 2007 World Championships in Athletics in Osaka on 26 August 2007.

The arts 
 Laurie Baker, Indian architect and Padma Shri awardee for Architecture, 1992.

Religious leaders 

 Philipose Chrysostom - Padma Bushan, world record holder for the longest serving bishop in the world, record holder as theme actor in the longest comprehensive biopic documentary ever made, Metropolitan Emeritus of the Mar Thoma Syrian Church.
Baselios Mar Thoma Paulose II - 8th Catholicos of the Malankara Orthodox Syrian Church (2010–present).
Puroshottam Choudhary - preacher, evangelist, writer of Christian literature
Joseph Mar Thoma - Metropolitan of the Mar Thoma Syrian Church. 
Aurobindo Nath Mukherjee - first Indian Bishop of Calcutta and Metropolitan of India
Lal Behari Dey - Indian journalist, writer, and Christian missionary
Ravi Zacharias(late) - Christian apologist, Founder and chairman of the board of Ravi Zacharias International Ministries.
D. G. S. Dhinakaran(late) - Christian evangelist.
Moran Mor Athanasius Yohan I,Metropolitan, founder and president of Gospel for Asia, He is also the founder and Metropolitan Bishop of Believers Eastern Church.
Valerian Gracias - First cardinal from India.
Duraisamy Simon Lourdusamy - First Indian to head a Sacred Congregation of the Catholic Church.
Acharya K. K. Chandy - President Emeritus- Fellowship of Reconciliation India; 1 of the 3 Founding Fathers - Christavashram, Kottayam; Founder Father- Gurukul Ecumenical Centre for Peace.
Varghese Payyappilly Palakkappilly - Founder of the Congregation of the Sisters of the Destitute.
Mary Celine Payyappilly - Servant of God, Professed Religious of the Congregation of the Mother of Carmel.
Varkey Vithayathil - Catholic Cardinal and former Major Archbishop of the Syro-Malabar Church.
Antony Padiyara - Catholic Cardinal and the First Major Archbishop of the Syro-Malabar Catholic Church.
Joseph Parecattil - First from the Syro-Malabar church to be made a cardinal.
Augustine Kandathil - First head of the Syro-Malabar Church and first Indian to assume powers and rule as an archbishop of the Catholic Church.
Kuriakose Elias Chavara - First Indian to be beatified Syro-Malabar Catholic Church.
Saint Alphonsa - first Indian Catholic to be raised to sainthood Syro-Malabar Catholic Church.
Mother Teresa of Kolkata - Founder of Missionaries of Charity and the most well-known Christian social worker of India (although Albanian and born in Skopje in Macedonia, she became an Indian).
V. C. Samuel - World-renowned Theologian, Historian, Ecumenical Leader, Professor/Dean in India and abroad, Priest, Indian Orthodox Church.
Cyril Baselios - Former head of the Syro-Malankara Catholic Church.
Mariam Thresia - Syro-Malabar Church.
 St. Euphrasia - Syro-Malabar Church.
 St. Joseph Vaz - Goan Oratorian priest and missionary to Sri Lanka
Rani Maria Vattalil - Catholic religious and missionary social worker in the Franciscan Clarist Congregation
Nidhiry Mani Kathanar - Priest of the Syro-Malabar Church who led a relentless campaign for indigenous bishops. Founder of Nazrani Deepika Malayalam newspaper.
Neiliezhü Üsou (1941–2009), an influential Baptist preacher, theologian, Church musician, music teacher and composer from the North-Eastern state of India, Nagaland.
Baselios Yeldo - was the Maphrian of the East of the Syriac Orthodox Church. He was the Catholicos of Jerusalem and Mosul. He is the Saint of Malankara Orthodox, Syriac Orthodox and Jacobite Orthodox Churches.
Baselios Mar Thoma Mathews I - First Catholicos who used Mar Thoma in his title. He was awarded The Order of St. Valdimer by the Patriarch of Russia.
Antonio Francisco Xavier Alvares - First Head of Goan Orthodox who was a Catholic Priest who joined Malankara Orthodox Syrian Church in search for real believes and worship.
Devasahayam Pillai (1712–1752), beatified convert, layman and martyr of the Roman Catholic Church.
Kattumangattu Abraham Mar Koorilos -(late)The first primate and Metropolitan of the Malabar Independent Syrian Church
Kattumanghattu Geevarghese Mar Koorilose-(late) was the Second primate and Metropolitan of the Malabar Independent Syrian Church
Geevarghese Gregorios - (1848-1902) First Indian to be raised to sainthood. First Saint of Malankara Church and the youngest one in Malankara to become a Bishop.
Kurien Thomas - founder of the Fellowship of the Pentecostal Churches in India and Central India Theological Seminary.
 Geevarghese Dionysius of Vattasseril (Dionysius VI) (1858-1934) Malankara Metropolitan and Saint of Malankara Orthodox Church.
Thomas Fernando, former Catholic bishop of Roman Catholic Diocese of Tuticorin
Francis Tiburtius Roche, former Catholic bishop of Roman Catholic Diocese of Tuticorin
Peter Fernando, former Catholic bishop of Roman Catholic Diocese of Tuticorin
John Banerjee, Anglican Assistant bishop of Lahore

Others in Christian ministry 
 Maria Theresa Chiramel - Catholic nun.
 Ken Gnanakan - Evangelist, singer, environmentalist and founder of Acts Ministries.
 P. C. John - Kerala Brethren person.
 Nirmala Joshi - Former Superior General of the Missionaries of Charity.
 Bakht Singh - (6 June 1903 – 17 September 2000) was a Christian evangelist in India and other parts of South Asia. 
 Sadhu Sundar Singh - Missionary, Christian universalist.
 Sadhu Kochoonju Upadesi - Malayali preacher and poet / composer.
 Benjamin Bailey (missionary) -Missionary, Founded the first College in India, Developed first English Malayalam Dictionary.
 Graham Staines – Australian missionary
Elizabeth Paul Sister at CSI Order of Sisters, First woman to be ordained to priesthood
 Joseph John (minister)
 ZAC Poonen (Bible Techer, CFC)

Literature 
Dom Moraes - India writer and poet
Henry Louis Vivian Derozio - Anglo-Indian poet and social worker
Krishna Mohan Banerjee - Bengali writer and first president of Bengal Christian Association
Michael Madhusudan Dutt - famous Bengali poet and dramatist
Toru Dutt - Bengali translator and poet in English and French
Narayan Waman Tilak, Marathi poet
Sarah Joseph. Is an Indian novelist and short story writer in Malayalam.
Thomas Joseph, Was an Indian writer of Malayalam literature.
Badal Sircar, Bengali playwright
Mario Miranda, cartoonist

Cultural leaders 
George Menachery - Historian, author, encyclopaedist, archaeologist, anthropologist, writer of Church History
Harris Jayaraj - A prominent music director mainly works in Tamil cinema
D. Imman - Music director of Tamil cinema
Fr. Paul Poovathingal, Carnatic music singer
K. J. Yesudas Singer

See also 
 Christianity in West Bengal
 Christianity in India
 Christianity in Andhra Pradesh
 Christianity in Tamil Nadu
 Goan Catholics
 List of Anglo-Indians
 List of Saint Thomas Christians
 List of Syro-Malabar Catholics
 Mangalorean Catholics
 Marathi Christians
 Malankara Orthodox Syrian Church

References 

Christians
Indian